Remake & Mix 18 Beon is the first remix and cover album by South Korean singer Psy. The album was released on July 23, 2005. The album contains 16 songs.

Production and release
The album was described by Psy as somewhat between sampling and Remake as he changed genres for the songs that he is remaking.The album was also released to increase his performance repertoire. The album was released with a dvd of his performances at his 2004 concert all night stand.
The album was rated 18+ for the DVD.

Reception
Psy's life theater series gained popularity for its different scenarios depicted in the lyrics based on blood type theory.

Track listing

Notes

References

2005 remix albums
Korean-language albums
Psy albums
Covers albums
EMI Records compilation albums